Flora, officially the Municipality of Flora, is a 3rd class municipality in the province of Apayao, Philippines. According to the 2020 census, it has a population of 17,944 people.

Flora was created into a municipality on June 22, 1963, when several barrios and sitios of Pudtol were constituted into the newly created town.

Geography

According to the Philippine Statistics Authority, the municipality has a land area of  constituting  of the  total area of Apayao.

Barangays
Flora is politically subdivided into 16 barangays. These barangays are headed by elected officials: Barangay Captain, Barangay Council, whose members are called Barangay Councilors. All are elected every three years.

Climate

Demographics

In the 2020 census, Flora had a population of 17,944.

Religion 
The dominant religion in the city is Roman Catholic (Saint Joseph Parish in Poblacion East. However, other Christian sectors are also present in Flora such as Iglesia ni Cristo, United Methodist Church.

Economy

Government
Flora, belonging to the lone congressional district of the province of Apayao, is governed by a mayor designated as its local chief executive and by a municipal council as its legislative body in accordance with the Local Government Code. The mayor, vice mayor, and the councilors are elected directly by the people through an election which is being held every three years.

Elected officials

References

External links

 [ Philippine Standard Geographic Code]

Municipalities of Apayao